Ian MacArthur (17 May 1925 – 30 November 2007) was a British Conservative Party politician who served as Member of Parliament for Perth and East Perthshire from 1959 until 1974.

Early life
MacArthur was born on 17 May 1925. He was the younger son of Lieutenant-General Sir William MacArthur. He was educated at Cheltenham College and Queen's College, Oxford.  He worked as an associate director of a marketing and advertising company.

Political career
MacArthur contested Greenock twice as a Unionist in 1955, in the general election and a by-election. He was Member of Parliament for Perth and East Perthshire from 1959 until his defeat at the October 1974 general election, when he lost by 793 votes to Douglas Crawford of the Scottish National Party.

In the House of Commons he was a whip 1963–65, as a Lord Commissioner of the Treasury 1963–64. He then became an opposition Scottish affairs spokesman.

Personal life
He married Judith Miller in 1957 and had 7 children, including Niall MacArthur, founder of Eat.

References 

Times Guide to the House of Commons, 1966 and October 1974

External links 
 

1925 births
2007 deaths
People educated at Cheltenham College
Alumni of The Queen's College, Oxford
Scottish Conservative Party MPs
Members of the Parliament of the United Kingdom for Scottish constituencies
UK MPs 1959–1964
UK MPs 1964–1966
UK MPs 1966–1970
UK MPs 1970–1974
UK MPs 1974
Unionist Party (Scotland) MPs
Ministers in the Macmillan and Douglas-Home governments, 1957–1964